Events from the year 1976 in Pakistan are given below.

Incumbents

Federal government 
President: Fazal Ilahi Chaudhry
Prime Minister: Zulfikar Ali Bhutto
Chief Justice: Muhammad Yaqub Ali

Governors
Governor of Balochistan: Ahmad Yar Khan 
Governor of Khyber Pakhtunkhwa: Syed Ghawas (until 1 March); Naseerullah Babar (starting 1 March)
Governor of Punjab: Mohammad Abbas Abbasi 
Governor of Sindh: Begum Ra'ana Liaquat Ali Khan (until 28 February); Muhammad Dilawar Khanji (starting 1 March)

Events
Five years after the secession of East Pakistan, Pakistan begins diplomatic relations with Bangladesh.
The Samjhauta Express, the only rail link between Pakistan and India, starts running.
The Quaid-i-Azam Academy is established on the 100th anniversary of the birth of Pakistan's founder.

Deaths
 29 April – Munawar Zarif

See also
1975 in Pakistan
1977 in Pakistan
List of Pakistani films of 1976
Timeline of Pakistani history

References

 
1976 in Asia